Anna Angelina Wolfers (born November 8, 1978) is a German actress, blogger, model and entrepreneur.

Life and work 
Anna Angelina Wolfers studied acting from 2003 to 2006 at the "Zentrum für Schauspiel, Bewegung und Tanz" and received further vocal and acting skills from Laura Tassi, both in Cologne. She became famous through her role in the telenovela Sturm der Liebe, which attracts millions of spectators every weekday in both Germany and Italy.

In 2008 Anna Angelina Wolfers was voted eighth sexiest woman in the world by the readers of the German edition of FHM. She was the highest ranked German woman on that list. In June 2009 she even ranked second in the same poll. The following photo shoot with her was printed in the editions of "FHM" and "Girls of FHM" in Germany, Britain, Singapore, Thailand and Australia.
In 2011 the readers of the German edition of GQ voted her on the first rank of the "GQ Top 100".

Her face became famous through ads and commercials for companies like Vodafone (2004) Pizza Hut (2008), REWE (since 2009) and McDonald's (2011).

Since 2008 she played one of the main characters in the web series Jabhook (aka. "Highroller und Tank"), directed by Christopher Becker and Daniel Rakete Siegel.

Apart from her acting and modelling careers, Anna Angelina Wolfers owns the boutique chain "Goldig".

In 2015 she started a blog about food, style, travel and fashion.

Filmography

Television

Movies

Music videos

Theatre

References

External links 
 Official website
 Her agency
 

Living people
1978 births
German television actresses